Spirits Burning is a musical collective that features musicians associated with space rock and progressive rock, including input from members of Blue Öyster Cult, Clearlight, Gong, and Hawkwind. Spirits Burning is overseen by American composer/producer Don Falcone.

History
In 1996, Falcone resurrected Spirits Burning. Spirits Burning was one of his first San Francisco bands, for which Falcone played bass and keyboards. Their first recording for a CD was a cover of the King Crimson song Red, on the tribute album “Schizoid Dimension,” released in 1997. Spirits Burning signed with French label Musea Records in 1998 and the group released their first album New Worlds By Design on Musea affiliate Gazul Records.

Falcone set Spirits Burning on their continuing mission just as the internet began to open up an index of collaborative possibilities that studio recordings and logistics previously precluded: the chance for content-creators to recruit musicians on an ad hoc basis across the ether; musicians they’d have scant hope of playing with face-to-face.

In the space rock community, Falcone has done particularly well out of this approach. A survey of his first 10 years under the Spirits Burning banner throws up some surprising contributors (including Daevid Allen, Porcupine Tree’s Steven Wilson, and High Tide’s Simon House).

In 2017, Spirits Burning performed live twice in England. The line-up was Steve Bemand, Richard Chadwick, Kev Ellis, Don Falcone, Colin Kafka, Martin Plumley, and Bridget Wishart.

Notable collaborations

Falcone, Albert Bouchard (formerly of Blue Öyster Cult), and writer Michael Moorcock have collaborated in Spirits Burning (under the name Spirits Burning & Michael Moorcock) to adapt two of Moorcock's novels: An Alien Heat and The Hollow Lands. Moorcock also plays harmonica on three songs on the 2021 Spirits Burning album Evolution Ritual and appeared on five tracks on the Spirits Burning CD Alien Injection, released in 2008. He is credited with singing lead vocals and playing guitar and mandolin. The performances used on the Alien Injection CD were from The Entropy Tango & Gloriana Demo Sessions.

Falcone and Bridget Wishart (formerly of Hawkwind) have collaborated in Spirits Burning (including releases under the name Spirits Burning & Bridget Wishart).

Falcone and Cyrille Verdeaux of Clearlight have collaborated in Spirits Burning (including releases under the name Spirits Burning & Clearlight).

Falcone and Daevid Allen (of Gong) have collaborated in Spirits Burning (including a single released under the name Spirits Burning & Daevid Allen).

Robert Calvert's Centigrade 232 tape recitation was first used with music on the second Spirits Burning album Reflections In A Radio Shower, released in 2001. Don Falcone took the original recording of Calvert reading his poem Centigrade 232 and integrated it into the track Drive-By Poetry. Lines from another Centigrade 232 poem ("Ode To A Crystal Set") appear on the CD's opening track Second Degree Soul Sparks.

Discography
1999: New Worlds by Design
2002: Reflections in a Radio Shower
2006: Found in Nature
2008: Alien Injection
2008: Earth Born (by Spirits Burning & Bridget Wishart)
2009: Our Best Trips: 1998 to 2008
2009: Golden Age Orchestra (by Spirits Burning & Thom The World Poet)
2009: Bloodlines (by Spirits Burning & Bridget Wishart)
2010: Crazy Fluid
2011: Behold The Action Man
2013: Healthy Music In Large Doses (by Spirits Burning & Clearlight)
2014: Make Believe It Real (by Spirits Burning & Bridget Wishart)
2015: Starhawk
2016: The Roadmap In Your Head (by Spirits Burning & Clearlight)
2017: "The Roadmap In Your Heart" b/w "Another Roadmap In Your Head" and "An Ambient Heat" (7-inch single, by Spirits Burning & Daevid Allen)
2018: An Alien Heat (by Spirits Burning & Michael Moorcock)
2020: The Hollow Lands (by Spirits Burning & Michael Moorcock)
2021: Evolution Ritual
2022: Recollections Of Instrumentals

Crew members and some of their sightings

The liner notes for each Spirits Burning album include the crew members (a list of musicians or lyricists who contributed to the album) and some of their sightings (a list of some of the bands or artists that each crew member has played with or is associated with).

This list includes crew members who have contributed to a Spirits Burning song or album. Notable associations are included.

A
 Igor Abuladze: The Humans
 Dave Adams
 Daevid Allen: Gong
 Andy Anderson: The Cure, Hawkwind
 Bruce Anderson
 Dave Anderson: Hawkwind
 Karen Anderson
 Yanik Lorenzo Andreatta
 Carroll Ashby
 Jsun Atoms: The Upsidedown
 Takahashi Atsuki (Tsuyama Atsushi): Acid Mothers Temple
 Ryan Avery

B
 Ileesha Bailey
 Harvey Bainbridge: Hawkwind, Hawklords
 Mark Barkan
 Giuliano Beber
 Steve Bemand: Hawkwind
 K. Soren Bengtsson
 Bond Bergland: Cluster, Factrix
 Robert Berry: 3, The Greg Kihn Band
 Louise Bialik
 Jon Birdsong: Beck Mushroom
 Eric Bloom: Blue Öyster Cult
 Andy Bole
 Paul Booth: Steve Winwood
 Albert Bouchard: Blue Öyster Cult
 Joe Bouchard: Blue Öyster Cult
 Paul Braunbehrens
 Scott Brazieal: 5uu's
 Alan Sitar Brown

C
 J. J. Cache
 Robert Calvert: Hawkwind, Hawklords
 Michael Camaro
 Dave Cameron: ST 37
 Marc Capelle
 Kevin Carnes: The Beatnigs, Consolidated
 Daniel Todd Carter
 Nat Carsten
 Cotton Casino: Acid Mothers Temple
 Anne Marie Castellano
 Richie Castellano: Blue Öyster Cult
 Richard Chadwick: Hawkwind
 Keith Christmas: David Bowie
 Michael Clare
 Graham Clark: Gong
 Alisa Coral
 Jaime Cortinas
 Chas Cronk: Strawbs
 David Cross: King Crimson
 Carlton Crutcher: ST 37
 Joel Crutcher: ST 37

D
 Andy Dalby: Arthur Brown's Kingdom Come
 Tom Dambly: Simpático
 Roger Davenport
 Alan Davey: Hawkwind
 Marcus Davis
 Dead Fred: Hawkwind
 Len Del Rio
 Herb Diamant
 Joe Diehl
 Matt Dowse
 Jim Dunn
 Judy Dyble: Fairport Convention

E
 Ian East: Gong
 Paul Eggleston
 John Ellis: The Vibrators, Peter Gabriel
 Kev Ellis
 Doug Erickson
 Sarah Evans
 Thom Evans
 Detlev Everling
 Renate Everling

F
 David Falcone
 Don Falcone
 Ernie Falcone
 Stella Ferguson
 Francesco Festi
 Dave Figoli
 Don Fleming
 Catherine Foreman
 Paul Fox
 Ana Torres Fraile
 Michael Freitas
 Craig Fry
 Erin Fusco

G
 Knut Gerwers
 Jack Gold-Molina
 Fabio Golfetti: Gong
 Uto G. Golin
 Claire Grainger
 Grawer
 Chris Green
 Tommy Grenas: Chrome, Nik Turner
 Mike Grimes

H
 Rick Hake
 Caron Hansford
 Ami Hassinen: Nemesis
 Steve Hayes
 Paul Hayles: Hawkwind
 Tom Heasley
 Amy Hedges
 Frank Hensel
 Sam Herzberg
 Higashi Hiroshi: Acid Mothers Temple
 Michael Holt: Mushroom
 Mike Howlett: Gong
 Keith Hill
 Steve Hillage: Gong, System 7, Clearlight
 Chris Hopgood
 David Hirschberg The Brain Surgeons
 Simon House: Hawkwind, David Bowie
 Carl Howard
 Ron Howden: Nektar
 Edward Huson

I
 Indy

J
 David Jackson: Van der Graaf Generator
 David James: Spearhead, Thessalonians
 Jerry Jeter
 Barney Jones
 Langdon Jones: New Worlds (magazine)
 Mason Jones
 Nigel Mazlyn Jones

K
 Jyrki Kastman: Nemesis
 Makoto Kawabata: Acid Mothers Temple
 Kenny Kearney
 Simon Keevil
 Keith The Bass
 Suharo Keizo: Acid Mothers Temple
 Peter Knight: Steeleye Span
 Keith Kniveton: Hawkwind
 William Kopecky
 Chris Kovacs
 Colin Kafka

L
 David L
 Tiffany Lamson
 Rick Landar: King Black Acid
 Jon Leidecker (Wobbly): Negativland
 Alison Lewis

M
 Gitta Mackay (Gitta Walther): Silver Convention
 Bert MacKenzie
 Emma MacKenzie
 Kenneth Magnusson
 Didier Malherbe: Gong
 Matt Malley: Counting Crows
 Mack Maloney
 Tony Mann
 Fabrizio Mattuzzi
 Nick May
 Michael Mayr
 Toby Marks (Banco de Gaia)
 Dana McCoy
 George McDonald
 Pierce E. McDowell
 Buck McGibbony
 Mac McIntyre
 Greg McKella
 Mychael Merrill
 Judy Merryweather
 Sindisiwe Mhlanga
 Dave Mihaly: Mushroom
 Bob Mild: The Upsidedown
 Danny Miranda: Blue Öyster Cult, Queen + Paul Rodgers
 Gabriel Monticello
 Mal Mooney: Can
 Michael Moorcock: Hawkwind
 Mike Moskowitz

N
 Deb Nash
 Giorgio Cesare Neri
 Roger S. Neville-Neil
 David Newhouse: The Muffins
 Juliette Norrmén-Smith

O
 Sean Orr
 Monty Oxymoron: The Damned

P
 John Pack
 Alex Palao: Mushroom
 Stephen Palmer
 Ursula Pank
 Jasper Pattison
 Gary Parra
 Pete Pavli: High Tide
 Doug Pearson
 Erik Pearson: Mushroom
 Stefanie Petrik
 Neil Pinnock
 Martin Plumley
 John Pluth
 Josh Pollock: Gong, Mushroom
 Nic Potter: Van der Graaf Generator
 Nigel Potter
 Lee Potts
 Mark Poulin
 John Purves (Purjah)
 Ken Pustelnik: The Groundhogs

R
 Jay Radford
 Jules Radino: Blue Öyster Cult
 Randy Raine-Reusch
 Kent Randolph: Amoeba Music
 Robert Rich
 Jerry Richards: Hawkwind
 Teed Rockwell
 Donald Roeser (Buck Dharma): Blue Öyster Cult
 Cyndee Lee Rule

S
 Trey Sabatelli: Jefferson Starship
 Dean Santomeiri
 Dark Santtu
 Andrew Scott
 Paul Sears: The Muffins
 Jonathan Segel: Camper Van Beethoven, Sparklehorse
 Karl E. H. Seigfried
 Adrian "Ade" Shaw: Hawkwind, The Bevis Frond
 Steffe Sharpstrings: Planet Gong, Here & Now
 Andy Shernoff: The Dictators, Ramones
 Billy Sherwood: Yes, William Shatner, Asia
 Fabienne Shine: Chrome
 Chris Shropshire
 Mick Slattery: Hawkwind
 Jessie May Smart: Steeleye Span
 Bruce Smith
 Graham Smith String Driven Thing, Van der Graaf Generator
 Judge Smith: Van der Graaf Generator
 Scotty Smith
 David Speight
 Karen Stackpole
 Kurt Statham: Mushroom
 Craig Stewart
 Mark Stone: ST 37
 Dave Sturt: Gong
 Dave Susser
 Steve Swindells: Hawkwind, Hawklords

T
 Jay Tausig
 Brian Tawn
 Steve Taylor
 Scott L . Telles: ST 37
 Vicente Tiburcio
 Thom The World Poet
 Huw Thomas
 Pat Thomas: Mushroom
 PJ Thomas
 Danny Thompson Jr: Hawkwind
 Trev Thoms: Inner City Unit
 Larry Thrasher: Psychic TV, Thee Majesty, Pigface
 Kavus Torabi: Gong
 Melissa Trancess
 Theo Travis: Gong, Soft Machine Legacy, Robert Fripp
 Nik Turner: Hawkwind, Inner City Unit
 Twink: Pretty Things, Pink Fairies

V
 Cyrille Verdeaux: Clearlight
 Jean van den Elsen
 Lux Vibratus: Nektar, Chrome

W
 Alan Wall
 Miles Walsh
 Tim Walters
 Darryl Way: Curved Air
 Carol Weeks
 Marc Weinstein: Amoeba Music
 Brian Wensing
 Peter Wetherbee: Praxis
 Richard Wileman
 Dave Willey: Hamster Theatre, Thinking Plague
 Paul Williams
 Tracy Lee Williams
 Harry Williamson
 Randy Wilson
 Steven Wilson: Porcupine Tree
 Bridget Wishart: Hawkwind
 Brooke Lynn Wright
 Pete Wyer
 Max Wynter

X
 Don Xaliman

Y
 Hoshiko Yamane: Tangerine Dream
 Pete Yarbrough
 Greg Yaskovic
 Steve York: Vinegar Joe, Manfred Mann Chapter Three

Z
 Yur Zappa
 Duane Zarakov
 Zero (Luis Davila)

References

External links
spiritsburning.com

Space rock musical groups
Progressive rock musical groups from California
Psychedelic rock music groups from California